The 2022 Call of Duty League season was the third season for the Call of Duty League, an esports league based on the video game franchise Call of Duty.

League format and changes

Teams 
Before the start of the 2022 season, Envy Gaming announced that it would be merging with OpTic Gaming, resulting in the Dallas Empire being renamed to OpTic Texas. As a result of the merger, the Chicago franchise spot became vacant, with the vacant spot being taken by a new franchise based in Boston, named the Boston Breach.

Broadcasting 
On January 21, the League announced that Esports Engine will become their official broadcasting partner for the 2022 season.

Shoutcasters Clint "Maven" Evans and Joe "Merk" DeLuca returned, although they were not given offers to return until just before the beginning of the season. In an interview with Dot Esports, general manager Daniel Tsay claimed that contract negotiations prevented from addressing their absence and stated that the pair will only call the Majors, playoffs, and Champs weekend.

Lottie Van-Praag and Jess Brohard both departed and were replaced by Loviel "Velly" Cardwell and Guy "Blaze" Spencer as desk host stage host, respectively. Alyssa "Allycxt" Parker was added as desk analyst, alongside a returning Anthony "NAMELESS" Wheeler.

Kickoff Classic 
The Kickoff classis ran from January 21 to January 23, 2022. The tournament was won by Toronto Ultra, with Seattle Surge coming in second.

The 2022 Kickoff Classic saw less viewership compared to its previous seasons, peaking at just under 80,000 concurrent viewers, compared to a 107,000 peak viewership from 2021.

Regular season

Format 
For the 2022 season, teams will play at four Majors on a hybrid online/LAN model. Each Major will take place over the course of 4 weeks, with each team playing online qualifying matches during the first three weeks against five random teams. After these three weeks the standings will be used to seed the teams for the major, with the bottom 4 teams starting in the Elimination Bracket.

In the middle of the season professional and amateur players will play against each other in a Pro-am tournament, and a Call of Duty: Warzone tournament featuring Call of Duty League pro players, streamers and other influencers will be organized as well.

Schedule 
To start the season, all twelve teams played against each other on January 21 through January 23, 2022 at the Esports Stadium Arlington in Arlington, Texas. Two weeks later, on February 4 through February 6, the 2022 season officially started with the first matches being played online. The online qualifiers for Major I ended on February 20, with the Major being hosted by OpTic Texas on March 3 through March 6. Major II online qualifiers will take place from March 11 through March 27, with the Major taking place on March 31 through April 3, with it being hosted by Minnesota ROKKR.

Before the start of Major III the midseason events will place with an online all-star weekend on April 9 and April 10. Two weeks later on April 24 the CDL Warzone Pacific tournament will take place which will see four players from all twelve teams fighting until the last man standing. On May 5 through May 8 the Pro-Am Classic will take place, which will see the twelve CDL teams being joined by the four best Challengers teams in a tournament with the winning team taking home $100,000.

One the midseason events have concluded Major III will be hosted by Toronto Ultra from June 2 through June 5, with the online qualifiers taking place May 13 through May 29. The final Major of the season will be hosted by New York Subliners, the online qualifiers are scheduled to take place on July 1 through July 17 with the Major itself taking place on July 21 through July 24.

The season will conclude with the 2022 Call of Duty League Playoffs and Championship, with dates yet to be announced.

Standings

Stage 1 
Stage 1 group stage began on February 4, 2022, and ended on February 20.

Group stage

Source:

Major
The Stage 1 Major ran from March 3 through March 6, 2022. The Major was won by OpTic Texas after being Atlanta FaZe 5–2 in the finals.

Stage 2 
Stage 2 group stage began on March 11, 2022, and ended on March 27.

Group stage

Major
The Stage 2 Major took place from March 31 through April 3, 2022, and was won by Los Angeles Guerrillas with Atlanta FaZe once again coming in second.

Pro-Am Classic
From May 5 through May 8, 2022, all twelve Call of Duty League teams alongside four Challengers teams competed against each other. The teams were put into 4 groups of 4, with three CDL teams and one Challengers team in each group. Teams played the other three teams in their group once, with the top 2 from each group advancing to a single elimination bracket. The tournament was won by the New York Subliners, with the Los Angeles Thieves coming in second.

Group A

Group B

Group C

Group D

Bracket

Stage 3 
Stage 3 group stage began on May 13, 2022, and ended on May 29. As part of Stage 3, the Call of Duty League introduced Bounty Week. From May 20 through May 22 all twelve teams played single series with $10,000 on the line for during series.

Group stage

Major
The Stage 3 Major took place from June 2 through June 5, 2022. The major was won by Seattle Surge, with Atlanta FaZe coming in second.

Stage 4 
Stage 4 group stage began on June 24, 2022, and ended on July 10.

Group stage

Major
The Stage 4 Major took place from July 14 through July 17, 2022. It was won by Los Angeles Thieves, with New York Subliners coming in second.

Championship 
The 2022 Call of Duty League Championship took place from August 4 through August 7, 2022. The top eight teams from the regular seasons standings competed in a Double Elimination bracket.

Bracket

Grand finals

References

External links
 

Call of Duty League seasons
Call of Duty